National Chi Nan University (NCNU) is a university located in Puli Township, Nantou County, Taiwan.

History

Founding 
The National Chi Nan University Planning Committee was established on 1 March 1991 in order to  establish a university with the following missions:
 To provide more higher education opportunities.
 To improve the education of Overseas Taiwanese.
 To assist in developing industries as a part of Six-Year National Construction Plan of Taiwan.
 To balance cultural and educational development between regions.

Land which had been the property of the Taiwan Sugar Corporation was selected as the campus of the new university in January 1992. The initial phase of construction of the university was completed in July 1995. The first classes of graduate students were enrolled at the University in September 1995. The first classes of undergraduates registered in September 1996, along with the official opening of the campus.

921 earthquake
When the devastating 1999 Jiji earthquake struck Nantou County on 21 September 1999 (921), all major buildings and dormitories in campus were critically damaged, and the University suffered a great loss of equipment and basic infrastructure. President Ricard Lee had led the three-day evacuation of the entire student body and the provisional relocation to the campus of National Taiwan University in Taipei City for one semester. The restoration of the campus was mostly completed in the following six months. The student body and all the Colleges went back to the campus in the next semester.

Ranking

Colleges

NCNU has four colleges: Education, Humanities, Management, and Science and Technology.

Featuring
The Taiwanese drama series, Hana Kimi was filmed here.

Notable natives
 Lin Li-chan, member of Legislative Yuan

See also
 List of universities in Taiwan

References

External links

National Chi Nan University
The Affiliated Senior High School of National Chi Nan University
National Chi Nan University Scholarships

 
1995 establishments in Taiwan
Educational institutions established in 1995
Universities and colleges in Nantou County